Eugene Francis Joseph "Huck" Geary (January 22, 1917 – January 27, 1981) was a Major League Baseball player.

Geary appeared in 55 games with the Pittsburgh Pirates in 1942 and 1943, compiling a relatively low .160 batting average and .437 OPS during that time. He did display a good batting eye, drawing 20 walks and striking out only nine times in 188 at bats. Geary caused some consternation for manager Frankie Frisch in 1943 by repeatedly returning home to New York City to visit his wife and children without first receiving permission from the club. To cover for Geary in the press, Frisch attributed his absence to a period of convalescence from "stomach and nervous trouble".

In his autobiography Veeck – As In Wreck, Bill Veeck relates a story about Geary and second baseman Eddie Stanky. Stanky was leading off for the Chicago Cubs in his first major league game on April 21, 1943, and the first pitch he saw as a batter hit him right in the head. After recovering his bearings, Stanky proceeded to first base, and when the second batter hit a slow ground ball, Stanky made a hard slide at second in an attempt to show that he was unfazed by the beaning. Geary was the shortstop on the play, and when Stanky cut his legs out from under him, he was injured. According to Veeck, there was some doubt that Geary would ever play again, and he did leave the majors for good at the end of that year. The play had the effect of establishing Stanky's reputation in the league as a tough player.

In a 14-inning game against the Boston Braves on June 1, 1943, Geary enjoyed one of the more significant accomplishments of his career, scoring the game's winning run by stealing home plate.

By 1946, Geary had been sent to the Hollywood Stars of the class AAA Pacific Coast League. A series of injuries to Pirate regulars, including infielders Bob Elliott, Billy Cox, and Frank Gustine, created an opportunity for Geary to return to the majors in September, but he was unwilling or unable to return, notifying the team that he would be of no further service for the remainder of the year.

The Pirates sold Geary's contract to the Indianapolis Indians of the American Association during that offseason, along with those of several other players: Maurice Van Robays, Bud Stewart, Ben Guintini, Aldon "Lefty" Wilkie, Alf Anderson, Ebba St. Claire, Don Kerr, and Carl Cox.

A native of Buffalo, New York, Geary died in Cuba, New York, 5 days after his 64th birthday.

References

External links

1917 births
1981 deaths
Major League Baseball shortstops
Baseball players from Buffalo, New York
Pittsburgh Pirates players
People from Cuba, New York